The Word is a 1943 Swedish drama film directed by Gustaf Molander, based on the 1925 play by Kaj Munk. It preceded Ordet by Carl Th. Dreyer by more than a decade.

Cast
Victor Sjöström as Knut Borg Sr.
Holger Löwenadler as Knut
Rune Lindström as Johannes
Stig Olin as Anders
Wanda Rothgardt as Inger
Gunn Wållgren as Kristina
Inga Landgré as Ester
Ludde Gentzel as Petter
Torsten Hillberg as Dr. Bergman
Olle Hilding as Brandeus

External links

1943 films
1940s Swedish-language films
Swedish black-and-white films
Films directed by Gustaf Molander
Swedish films based on plays
Swedish drama films
1943 drama films
1940s Swedish films